Respectable is a British sitcom, first shown in six episodes from 30 August to 4 October 2006 on Five; it was later repeated on Paramount Comedy 1 and Paramount Comedy 2.

It follows Michael Price, a man acutely aware of his own dullness, trapped in a loveless marriage. In the first episode, he hesitantly visits a suburban brothel. Terrified of sex, he strikes up a platonic relationship with a young prostitute, Hayley. The series follows the development of this relationship, and Michael's attempts to conceal his visits to the brothel from his wife. This is complicated by the discovery that his builder, Barry, is a frequent and uninhibited visitor to the brothel.

The show was written by Shaun Pye, Alan Connor and Harry Thompson. Former Hollyoaks actress Jodi Albert plays Hayley, a dumb hooker with a heart of gold; Kate is a university student, owner Maureen is a more mature lady who claims to be 27, while Yelena is a dominant Eastern European. Of the characters who don't work there, Michael is going through a mid-life crisis, while his friendly builder Barry is a typical "Jack the lad".

Characters

International broadcasters 
Bold - Canada
Comedy Central - Netherlands
UKTV Foxtel - Australia

DVD release
Respectable was released on region 2 in the UK on DVD on 9 October 2006 via 2entertain distribution.

References

External links
Paramountcomedy.com info

Channel 5 (British TV channel) sitcoms
2000s British sitcoms
2006 British television series debuts
2006 British television series endings